The 2021 Pro Bowl was to be the National Football League all-star game for the 2020 NFL season, originally scheduled to be played on January 31, 2021, at Allegiant Stadium in Paradise, Nevada.

On October 14, 2020, the NFL announced that it had canceled the game due to the COVID-19 pandemic, and had deferred Las Vegas's hosting of the game to 2022. The league still conducted a fan vote to determine the Pro Bowl rosters, and instead organized alternative festivities such as Verzuz "highlight battles" featuring NFL players; and an eSports exhibition featuring a game of Madden NFL 21 played with the Pro Bowl rosters (controlled by teams of NFL players, alumni, and celebrity guests).

Background
The original site for the game was announced on June 16, 2020. The Las Vegas Raiders' home Allegiant Stadium's bid won out over Camping World Stadium in Orlando, Florida, and SoFi Stadium in the Los Angeles metro area.

On October 14, 2020, the league decided to cancel the game amid the COVID-19 pandemic, and Allegiant Stadium was awarded the 2022 Pro Bowl instead. The league further announced that the Pro Bowl rosters for the 2020 season would still be voted upon, and that they would instead hold alternative events to honor the players chosen. Voting began on November 17, 2020, on the NFL's website and Madden NFL 21, and on Twitter starting on December 1. Voting on all platforms then ended on December 17 with the rosters being announced on December 21.

Alternative events 
The NFL partnered with Verzuz to air a series of Pro Bowl "highlight battles" from January 26 through 29.

ABC, ESPN, and Disney XD aired a television special on January 31 in place of the game—the Pro Bowl Celebration—which was presented by ESPN's NFL studio analysts, and featured segments and interviews honoring the Pro Bowl roster.

Pro Bowl esports exhibition
The esports exhibition was played from their respective homes, in order, quarterback Deshaun Watson (Houston Texans), former wide receiver Keyshawn Johnson, running back Derrick Henry (Tennessee Titans), and rapper Snoop Dogg each played one quarter as the AFC team, while quarterback Kyler Murray (Arizona Cardinals), NASCAR Cup Series driver Bubba Wallace (23XI Racing), strong safety Jamal Adams (Seattle Seahawks), and former running back Marshawn Lynch each played one quarter as the NFC team.

Esports box score

AFC roster

Offense

Defense

Special teams

NFC roster

Offense

Defense

Special teams

Number of selections per team

References

External links

2021
2020 National Football League season
2021 in American football
Pro Bowl, 2021
Virtual events
Esports competitions